An experimental forest, or experimental range, as defined by the United States Forest Service, is "an area administered ... 'to provide for the research necessary for the management of the land.'"

Size and relation to other areas
According to the USFS, "Most Experimental Forests are large enough to contain significant stream systems and several dozen contain experimental watershed study sites with multiple paired basins." Experimental forests are distinguished from research natural areas and intensive monitoring sites.

History
The present system of 80 experimental forests and ranges began in 1908. Many experimental forest are more than 50 years old.

Experimental forests and ranges in the United States
 Alum Creek Experimental Forest, Arkansas
 Argonne Experimental Forest, Wisconsin
 Baltimore Long Term Ecological Research, Maryland (cooperating)
 Bartlett Experimental Forest, New Hampshire
 Beaver Creek Experimental Watershed, Arizona
 Bent Creek Experimental Forest, North Carolina
 Big Falls Experimental Forest, Minnesota
 Black Hills Experimental Forest in South Dakota is used to study ponderosa pine timber production, mountain pine beetle, and wildlife habitat.
 Blacks Mountain Experimental Forest, California
 Blue Valley Experimental Forest, 
 Boise Basin Experimental Forest in Idaho is used to study old-growth restoration, prescribed fire, and root-system structures.
 Bonanza Creek Experimental Forest, Alaska
 Calhoun Experimental Forest, South Carolina
 Caribou-Poker Creeks Research Watershed, Alaska (cooperating)
 Cascade Head Experimental Forest, Oregon
 Caspar Creek Experimental Watershed, California
 Challenge Experimental Forest, California
 Chipola Experimental Forest, Florida
 Clemson Experimental Forest surrounds the Clemson University campus in South Carolina. The 17,500 acre forest is the largest university forest adjacent to its campus in the country. It is used for research, education, and recreation.
 Crossett Experimental Forest is located in Ashley County, Arkansas.
 Coulee Experimental Forest, Wisconsin
 Coweeta Hydrologic Laboratory, North Carolina
 Coram Experimental Forest in Montana is used to study western larch, Douglas-fir, forest regeneration, forest growth, silvicultural systems, climate, and hydrology.
 Cutfoot Sioux Experimental Forest, Minnesota
 Deception Creek Experimental Forest in Idaho is used to study sediment movement and transport, forest genetics, root disease, small tree use, and fire effects.
 Delta Experimental Forest, Mississippi
 Denbigh Experimental Forest, North Dakota
 Desert Experimental Range in Utah is used to study cold-desert-plant communities, desertification, sheep management, rodent ecology, pronghorn antelope, soils, and bird and mammal populations.
 Dukes (Upper Peninsula) Experimental Forest, Michigan
 Entiat Experimental Forest, Washington
 Escambia Experimental Forest, Alabama
 Estate Thomas Experimental Forest, U.S. Virgin Islands
 Fernow Experimental Forest, West Virginia
 Fort Valley Experimental Forest in Arizona is used to study forest diseases, forest restoration, wildland-urban interface studies, and fire effects.
 Fraser Experimental Forest is on the western slopes of the Continental Divide in Colorado.
 Glacier Lakes Ecosystem Experiments Site (GLEES) in Wyoming is used to study seedling germination, nitrogen deposits, riparian hydrology, disturbance changes, tree growth, atmospheric pollutants.
 Great Basin Experimental Range in Utah is used to study plant adaptation and ecosystem shifts, nutrient cycling, replanting, restoration ecology, and game habitat.
 H. J. Andrews Experimental Forest, Oregon
 Harrison Experimental Forest, Mississippi
 Hawaii Experimental Tropical Forest, Hawaii
 Héen Latinee, Alaska
 Henry R. Koen Experimental Forest, Arkansas
 Hill Forest, NC State Univ.	North Carolina (cooperating)
 Hitchiti Experimental Forest, Georgia
 Howland Cooperating Experimental Forest, Maine (cooperating)
 Hubbard Brook Experimental Forest, New Hampshire
 Kane Experimental Forest, Pennsylvania
 Kaskaskia Experimental Forest, Illinois
 Kings River Experimental Watershed, California
 Long Valley Experimental Forest (Arizona) — ponderosa pine, burning interval effects, tree growth history.
 Lower Peninsula Experimental Forest, Michigan
 Luquillo Experimental Forest, Puerto Rico
 Manitou Experimental Forest (Colorado) — ponderosa pine ecosystems, fire, insect and bird biology, dwarf mistletoe, and wildland-urban interface issues.
 Marcell Experimental Forest located in Chippewa National Forest and 40 km north of Grand Rapids, Minnesota.
 Massabesic Experimental Forest, Maine
 Maybeso Experimental Forest, Alaska
 North Mountain Experimental Area, California
 Olustee Experimental Forest, Florida
 Olympic Experimental State Forest, Washington (cooperating)
 Onion Creek Experimental Forest, California
 Palustris Experimental Forest, Louisiana
 Paoli Experimental Forest, Indiana
 Pike Bay Experimental Forest, Minnesota
 Priest River Experimental Forest in Idaho is used to study woody debris, soil productivity, acid deposits, seedling development, water yield and quality, and wood decomposition.
 Pringle Falls Experimental Forest, Oregon
 Redwood Experimental Forest is located in Northern California near the mouth of the Klamath River.
 Rhinelander Experimental Forest, Wisconsin	 
 Sagehen Experimental Forest, California
 San Dimas Experimental Forest in southern California covers 6,945 hectares in the San Gabriel Mountains.
 San Joaquin Experimental Range is in the foothills of the Sierra Nevada in California.
 Santa Rita Experimental Range is located in southern Arizona and is the oldest experimental range in the United States.
 Santee Experimental Forest, South Carolina
 Scull Shoals Experimental Forest, Georgia
 Sierra Ancha Experimental Forest in Arizona is used for long-term hydrologic studies.
 Silas Little Experimental Forest, New Jersey
 Sinkin Experimental Forest, Missouri
 South Umpqua Experimental Forest, Oregon
 Stanislaus-Tuolumne Experimental Forest is in the central Sierra Nevada in California.
 Starkey Experimental Forest and Range, Oregon
 Stephen F. Austin Experimental Forest, Texas
 Swain Mountain Experimental Forest, California
 Sylamore Experimental Forest, Arkansas
 Tallahatchie Experimental Forest, Mississippi
 Teakettle Experimental Forest, California
 Tenderfoot Creek Experimental Forest in Montana is used to study hydrology, climate, and regenerating and restoring lodgepole pine.
 Udell Experimental Forest, Michigan
 Vinton Furnace Experimental Forest, Ohio
 Wind River Experimental Forest, Washington
 Young Bay Experimental Forest, Alaska

See also
 List of types of formally designated forests

References

Agriculture in the United States
Forestry in the United States
Types of formally designated forests